The 1998 Women's County One-Day Championship was the 2nd cricket Women's County Championship season. It took place in July and saw 10 county teams, 3 county Second XIs and 5 regional teams compete in a series of divisions. Yorkshire Women won the County Championship as winners of the top division, achieving their second Championship title in two seasons.

Competition format 
Teams played matches within a series of divisions with the winners of the top division being crowned County Champions. Matches were played using a one day format with 50 overs per side.

The championship works on a points system with positions within the divisions being based on the total points. Points were awarded as follows:

Win: 12 points. 
Tie:  6 points. 
Loss: Bonus points.
No Result: 11 points.
Abandoned: 11 points.

Up to five batting and five bowling points per side were also available.

Teams
The 1998 Championship consisted of 18 teams, competing in three divisions of six teams apiece. Teams played each other once.

Division One 

Source: Cricket Archive

Division Two 

Source: Cricket Archive

Division Three 

Source: Cricket Archive

Statistics

Most runs

Source: CricketArchive

Most wickets

Source: CricketArchive

References

1998